Personal Structures is an international contemporary art platform, which generates the possibility for artists and art historians to discuss philosophical concepts in art.

Personal Structures was initiated in 2003 by the artist Rene Rietmeyer. At first, the platform took shape in the form of exhibitions. Later on, in 2005, symposia were added as means for expressing thought. The first Personal Structures symposium was held at the branch of Ludwig Museum in Koblenz, Germany. Personal Structures developed in the years after. In 2007 and 2008 a symposium series was organised about the concepts time, space and existence.

Artists who have been involved in Personal Structures are, amongst others, Joseph Kosuth, Wolfgang Laib, Roman Opałka, and Lawrence Weiner.

Literature 
 Peter Lodermeyer, Karlyn De Jongh & Sarah Gold, Personal Structures: Time Space Existence, DuMont, Germany 2009
 Peter Lodermeyer, Personal Structures "Works and dialogs", GlobalArtAffairs Publishing, New York, 2003
 Peter Lodermeyer (ed.), Personal Structures Symposium Ludwig Museum, GlobalArtAffairs Publishing, New York, 2006

References 

 Personal Structures in Art Magazine Balkon Hungary
 Personal Structures in Junge Kunst Magazine Germany

External links 
 

International artist groups and collectives
Contemporary art organizations